International Christian Academy (ICA) was an American boarding school in Bouaké, Ivory Coast.

History
It was established in 1962 as Ivory Coast Academy by the Conservative Baptist Foreign Mission Society (now Venture Church Network) and its main purpose was to provide a standard American education to the children of missionaries in West Africa. In 2002, it had some 160+ students from 13 nations in grades 1–12.

In September 2002, during the Ivorian Civil War, children were trapped at the school for a week by fighting between government soldiers and rebels opposed to President Laurent Gbagbo. Eventually they were evacuated unharmed by French troops to government held Yamoussoukro. Some of the students and staff then relocated to Dakar Academy in Senegal in order to complete the school year. The ICA campus in eastern Bouaké was then used as a French military base in rebel-held Côte d'Ivoire.

ICA was accredited by the Association of Christian Schools International and the Middle States Association of Colleges and Schools.

In February 2005, the ICA School Board formally closed the school with no prospects of reopening.

The ICA campus is presently known as Village Baptiste.  The campus is administered by The Association of Evangelical Baptist Churches of Côte d'Ivoire (AEBECI).  A portion of the campus has been rented to the medical branch of the local university.  Journey Corps, a branch of Mission Baptiste has its base on the campus.  There is also a church meeting in what was previously the ICA chapel.  A Bible study for medical students and other resident occurs weekly. The houses and dormitories are full and much activity occurs daily.

See also

 Christianity in Ivory Coast
 Education in Ivory Coast

References

External links 
 ICA Website
 History of ICA
 List of ICAers who blog
 Images from ICA Evacuation in 2002

1962 establishments in Ivory Coast
2005 disestablishments in Ivory Coast
Baptist schools
Bouaké
Buildings and structures in Vallée du Bandama District
Christian schools in Africa
Co-educational boarding schools
Defunct Christian schools
Defunct high schools
Defunct schools in Ivory Coast
Educational institutions disestablished in 2005
Educational institutions established in 1962
Defunct elementary and primary schools
Religious schools in Ivory Coast